"Baby Doll" is a Punjabi song by Indian Bollywood playback singer Kanika Kapoor for the Bollywood movie Ragini MMS 2 pictured on the lead actress of the film, Sunny Leone. For this song Kanika Kapoor won Filmfare Awards of best female playback singer.

Critical reception
Reviewers from Times of India wrote− Meet Bros Anjjan lead from the front with Baby Doll, also featuring the vocals of Kanika Kapoor with lyrics by Kumaar. 
The hit Punjabi track, currently sitting pretty on the numero uno position on the Mirchi Top 20 Bollywood chart, is a hook-filled dance number that has definite repeat value. Mohar Basu of Koimoi wrote− Baby Doll song is energetic and vibrant. Kanika Kapoor's enticing voice is so powerful that you can't abandon this song even if you intend to. Meet Bros. give quite an alluring song, with the right techno beats working off the trance ambiance of this sensational party number. But the song can be expected to take a backseat when the show gets all sunny!

Joginder Tuteja from Rediff wrote− The album starts with Meet Brothers' Anjjan singing the fiery Kumaar written Baby Doll. The song has chartbuster written all over it.
The Punjabi-Hindi-English number has some naughty lyrics complementing Sunny Leone's presence in the film. It is also special due to Kanika Kapoor's unique singing style. 
With Meet Brothers' Anjjan giving her good support behind the mike, Kanika has good fun making her debut in Bollywood.

Suanshu Khurana of Indian Express wrote that Baby doll sticks from the moment the first hook hits us. One of the more vibrant item numbers after Munni, the star of the song is Kanika Kapoor, the raw texture of whose slightly shrill voice sounds right out of a ladies sangeet in the interiors of Punjab. There is also a Zandu Balm reference (second in the history of Bollywood music, first one being in Munni) in a coarsely crafted one liner that goes Laava Zandu balm je nachde pai jan thamka. What's more interesting is the track's orchestration, which is quite contemporary as all the beats have come out of an octapad. The trademark tumbi is the only Punjabi folk instrument, which rings throughout.

Release and performance
A teaser video of the song was released on YouTube 6 February 2014.
The video song was released on YouTube on 12 February 2014.
The audio song was released as a single on 14 February 2014. For most of the year, it was on the top charts on several music channels. "Baby Doll" also became a euphemism for Sunny Leone.

Awards and nominations

References

Hindi film songs
2014 songs
Songs written for films
Indian songs
Punjabi-language songs
Macaronic songs
Songs with lyrics by Kumaar